The Msikaba bridge is a cable-stayed steel deck bridge, currently under construction, spanning the Msikaba River, near Lusikisiki in the Eastern Cape of South Africa.
The Msikaba bridge forms part of the N2 Wild Coast (N2WC) road project, which aims to improve the travel time between Durban and East London for heavy freight vehicles.

Bridge design
Designed by the Danish firm Dissing+Weitling, the bridge when complete will have a main span of 580m supported from a pair of 127m-tall pylons. The deck will be 194m above the valley floor, making it the third highest bridge in Africa.

Contract award
In 2017 the South African National Roads Agency (SANRAL) awarded the tender for the bridge's construction to the Concor Mota-Engil Joint Venture (CMEJV), which comprises Concor, a South African-based construction company, and Mota-Engil, a Portuguese construction company at a cost of US$118 million.

It is estimated that 28 000 cubic metres of concrete, 2 700 tons of structural steel and 2 500 tons of cables will be needed during construction. The balance of works contained in the contract which includes construction of 1,5 km of approach roadworks on either side of the bridge. Expressed in quantities, this will include 650,000 m³ of bulk earthworks of which 430,000 m³ is hard rock, a conventional three span bridge and four in-situ concrete culverts crossing some of the tributaries.  A temporary gondola lift system will reduce travel time between opposite sides of the bridge during construction.

Construction timeline

See also 
List of bridges in South Africa
List of highest bridges in the world

References 

Bridges in South Africa
Bridges under construction
N2 road (South Africa)
Cable-stayed bridges